Jochen Dornbusch is the coach for the men's Hong Kong national team.
He is the former coach of Germany's National Women's Cycling Team. Under Dornbusch's tutelage, German cycle racers have developed and advanced to the world's top rank of women's cycle racing, including Ina Teutenberg, Jacqueline Brabenetz, Angela Brodtka, Judith Arndt, and former World Junior Champion Tina Liebig.

References

German cycling coaches
Living people
Year of birth missing (living people)
Sportspeople from Duisburg
German expatriate sportspeople in Hong Kong